The MLS Cup Playoffs is the annual postseason elimination tournament of Major League Soccer. The MLS Cup, the league's championship game, is the final match of the tournament. Under the current format adopted for the 2023 season, 18 teams qualify for the tournament based on regular-season point totals — the nine highest-placed teams from each the Eastern Conference and the Western Conference. Audi is the title sponsor of this tournament.

Awarding a championship through a postseason tournament differs from most other soccer leagues around the world, where the team with the most points at the end of the season is deemed champion. MLS awards the regular-season champions with the Supporters' Shield and both champions earn a berth in the CONCACAF Champions League, the continental tournament.

Playoff system
Since 2023, the top nine teams from the Eastern Conference and top nine teams from the Western Conference qualify for the playoffs, playing in separate brackets. The Wild Card round, Conference Semifinals, Conference Finals, and the MLS Cup are single-match eliminations hosted by the team with the better regular season record, while the conference quarterfinals is a best-of-3 series with the higher seeds hosting the odd-numbered games with no re-seeding any round. A penalty shoot-out are used if the teams are still tied in all games while extra time (divided into two 15-minute periods) are utilized from Conference Semifinals onwards.

The top seven teams in each conference are given byes to the conference quarterfinals. The teams ranked 8th through 9th in each conference compete in the Wild-card round, with the winner advancing to the conference quarterfinals to face the top seed. The winners of the first round series advances to the Conference Semifinals. Winners of that round play in the Conference Finals which is then followed by MLS Cup, a single match hosted by the finalist with the better regular season record. 

The Conference Semifinals and Conference Finals were formerly conducted in a home-and-away, aggregate-goal format. From 2014 to 2018, the away goals rule was used for these rounds. In both rounds, the higher-seeded team hosted the second leg. If the teams were tied after two games (180 minutes), the team that scored more goals on the road advanced. If there was still a tie after the away goals rule has been applied, the teams played 30 minutes of extra time (divided into two 15-minute periods), followed by a penalty shoot-out if necessary. The away goals rule did not apply to goals scored in these extra time periods.

Qualification
Eighteen teams qualify for the playoffs: the top nine teams from the Eastern Conference and the Western Conference that had earned the best points per game record during the 34-game regular season. The top seven teams in each conference get a first-round bye, advancing to the conference quarterfinals.

Tie-breaking procedures
If at least two teams finish the regular season with an equal number of points, the following criteria are used to break the tie.

 most wins
 goal differential
 goals scored
 fewer disciplinary points
 away goal differential
 away goals scored
 home goal differential
 home goals scored
 coin toss (2 clubs) or drawing of lots (3 clubs)

Note:
If two clubs remain tied after another club with the same number of points advances during any step, the tie breaker reverts to step 1 for the two remaining clubs.
Head-to-head competition results have not been used in tie-breakers since 2012.

History

MLS playoff records

 Records include all knockout playoff matches, individual legs of aggregate-goal rounds, and MLS Cup appearances.

Goals
Note: Players in bold are still active for an MLS club.

Records

 Matches determined by shoot-out counted as win–loss, not draw

Appearances

 
 Miami Fusion and Tampa Bay Mutiny folded after completion of the 2001 season
 Chivas USA folded after completion of the 2014 season

MLS playoff shoot-outs

 

 MLS began implementing a shoot-out to determine the winner of a playoff series in 2004.
 From 2014 to 2018 the away goals rule was used (but not in extra time).

 Game played at neutral location

See also
MLS Cup
Playoffs
List of MLS club post-season droughts

References

External links
MLS standings

 
Annual sporting events in the United States
National association football league cups
Soccer cup competitions in the United States